Zhang Shengmin (born February 1958) is a general of the Chinese People's Liberation Army Rocket Force. He is a member of the Central Military Commission (CMC) and Secretary of the CMC Commission for Discipline Inspection. He is also a Deputy Secretary of the Central Commission for Discipline Inspection, the top anti-corruption agency of China.

Career 
Zhang Shengmin was born in 1958; his ancestral home is in Wugong County, Shaanxi Province.

Zhang Shengmin spent most his career as a political commissar in the Second Artillery Force (now the People's Liberation Army Rocket Force). He served as Political Commissar of the Second Artillery Force Command Academy, and then of a missile base of the Second Artillery Force.

In 2010, when he was posted at a military base in Northwest China, he led more than 1,000 troops in the reconstruction work immediately after the 2010 Yushu earthquake in Qinghai Province. His unit helped to build emergency living quarters for the monks at the Changu Monastery, the largest Kagyu Tibetan Buddhist temple in Yushu Tibetan Autonomous Prefecture.

In January 2017, Zhang was appointed Secretary of Commission for Discipline Inspection of the Central Military Commission. He replaced General Du Jincai, who was closely associated with the former CMC vice-chairmen Guo Boxiong and Xu Caihou, both of whom had been investigated for corruption.

During the 19th National Congress of the Chinese Communist Party in October 2017, Zhang was elected a member of the 19th Central Committee. He was also made one of the four members of the Central Military Commission and one of the eight deputy secretaries of the Central Commission for Discipline Inspection, which is in charge of investigating corruption by Communist Party members. A week later, on 2 November 2017, Zhang was promoted to the rank of general (shang jiang) by CMC chairman Xi Jinping.

References 

1958 births
Living people
People's Liberation Army generals from Shaanxi
People of Central Military Commission (China)
Members of the 19th Central Committee of the Chinese Communist Party